Michael Knetter is a past dean of the Wisconsin School of Business.  Effective October 16, 2010, Knetter is the new president and chief executive officer of the University of Wisconsin Foundation—the official fundraising arm of the University of Wisconsin-Madison. He was educated at the University of Wisconsin–Eau Claire and received his doctorate from Stanford University.  Knetter is widely published in the field of international and macroeconomics.  He was a senior staff economist for Bill Clinton and George H. W. Bush. Before becoming the dean of the Wisconsin School Business he worked as a professor and as the associate dean at the Amos Tuck School of Business at Dartmouth College.  He is currently a research associate at the National Bureau of Economic Research.

Additionally, Knetter has received much praise for his fundraising technique.  Steven Levitt wrote in The New York Times that "Michael Knetter may just go down as one of the greatest fundraisers of all time." Knetter received this praise due to his 85 million dollar fundraising campaign for the University of Wisconsin-Madison.

References

External links
About the Dean: Mike Knetter

Living people
21st-century American economists
University of Wisconsin–Madison faculty
University of Wisconsin–Eau Claire alumni
Stanford University alumni
Year of birth missing (living people)